The 2020 Chinese Women's Super League, officially known as the 2020 China Taiping Chinese Football Association Women's Super League for sponsorship reasons, was the 6th season in its current incarnation, and the 24th total season of the women's association football league in China. The number of the teams was expanded to 10 in this season. All matches were held at Yunnan Haigeng Football Base. The season was split into two stages. The first stage started on 23 August and concluded on 18 September 2020. The second stage started on 27 September and concluded on 11 October 2020.

Clubs

Club changes
Clubs promoted from 2019 Chinese Women's League One
 Hebei China Fortune
 Shandong Sports Lottery
 Zhejiang

Dissolved entries
 Dalian

Name changes
 Henan Huishang F.F.C. was acquired by men's football club Henan Jianye as their women's football section and changed their name to Henan Jianye W.F.C. in April 2020.

Stadiums and locations

Foreign players
Clubs can register a total of four foreign players (excluding goalkeepers) over the course of the season, but the number of foreign players allowed on each team at any given time is limited to three. A maximum of two foreign players can be fielded at any given time in each match.

Regular season

League table

Results

Positions by round

Results by match played

Championship stage

League table

Results

Positions by round

Results by match played

Relegation stage

League table

Results

Positions by round

Results by match played

Championship playoffs

Third place playoffs

Goalscorers

Top scorers
Source: China Women's Football - 中国女足

Top assists

References

External links
  (in Chinese)

2020
2019–20 domestic women's association football leagues
2020–21 domestic women's association football leagues
+